The Village (marketed as M. Night Shyamalan's The Village) is a 2004 American period thriller film written, produced, and directed by M. Night Shyamalan. It stars Bryce Dallas Howard, Joaquin Phoenix, Adrien Brody, William Hurt, Sigourney Weaver, and Brendan Gleeson. The film is about a village whose population lives in fear of creatures inhabiting the woods beyond it, referred to as "Those We Don't Speak Of".

The Village received mixed reviews, with many critics expressing disappointment with the twist ending. James Newton Howard was nominated for Best Original Score at the 77th Academy Awards. The film was a financial success as it grossed $257 million worldwide against a $60 million production budget.

Plot
Residents of the small, isolated, 19th-century, Pennsylvania village of Covington live in fear of "Those We Don't Speak Of", nameless humanoid creatures living within the surrounding woods. The villagers have constructed a large barrier of oil lanterns and watchtowers that are constantly staffed. After the funeral of a child, the village Elders deny Lucius Hunt's request for permission to pass through the woods to get medical supplies from "the towns". Later, his mother Alice scolds him for wanting to visit "the towns", which the villagers describe as wicked. The Elders also appear to have secrets, keeping physical mementos hidden in black boxes, supposedly reminders of the evil and tragedy in the towns they left behind.

After Lucius makes an unsanctioned venture into the woods, the creatures leave warnings in the form of splashes of red paint on all the villagers' doors.

Ivy Elizabeth Walker, the blind daughter of Chief Elder Edward Walker, informs Lucius that she has strong feelings for him and he returns her affections. They arrange to be married, but Noah Percy, a young man with an apparent developmental disability, stabs Lucius out of jealousy. Noah is locked in a room while a decision awaits regarding his fate.

Edward goes against the wishes of the other Elders, agreeing to let Ivy pass through the forest and seek medicine for Lucius. Before she leaves, Edward explains that the creatures inhabiting the woods are members of their community wearing costumes and have continued the legend of monsters to frighten and deter others from attempting to leave. Two young men are sent to accompany Ivy into the forest, but they abandon her almost immediately, fearful of the creatures. While traveling through the forest, one of the creatures attacks Ivy. She tricks it into falling into a deep hole to its death. The creature is Noah wearing one of the costumes, which he discovered under the floorboards of the room where he had been confined after stabbing Lucius. As she travels through the woods, Ivy's parents unlock a box and look at photographs of the elders outside a counseling center, revealing that it is the early 21st century instead of the 19th century.

After she climbs over the wall at the edge of the woods, Ivy encounters a park ranger driving a patrol car who is shocked to hear that she has come out of the woods. Ivy gives the ranger a list of medicines that she must acquire.

The ranger talks to his boss, not mentioning his encounter with Ivy. The village was founded in the late 1970s by Edward Walker, then a professor of American history at the University of Pennsylvania. Recruiting people he met at a grief counseling clinic, they join in creating a place where they would live and be protected from any aspect of the outside world. Edward's family fortune purchased a wildlife preserve, built Covington in the middle, funded a ranger corps to make sure no one got in, and even paid off the government to make it a no-fly zone.

The park ranger retrieves the requested medicine from the ranger station and Ivy returns to the village, unaware of the truth of the situation.

During her absence, the Elders secretly open their black boxes, each containing mementos from their lives in the outside world, including items related to their past traumas as crime victims. They gather around Lucius's bed when they hear that Ivy has returned and that she killed one of the monsters. Edward points out to Noah's grieving mother that his death will allow them to continue deceiving the rest of the villagers that there are creatures in the woods.

Cast

 Bryce Dallas Howard as Ivy Elizabeth Walker
 Joaquin Phoenix as Lucius Hunt
 Adrien Brody as Noah Percy
 William Hurt as Edward Walker
 Sigourney Weaver as Alice Hunt
 Brendan Gleeson as August Nicholson
 Cherry Jones as Mrs. Clack
 Celia Weston as Vivian Percy
 Frank Collison as Victor
 Jayne Atkinson as Tabitha Walker
 Judy Greer as Kitty Walker
 Fran Kranz as Christop Crane
 Liz Stauber as Beatrice
 Michael Pitt as Finton Coin
 Jesse Eisenberg as Jamison
 M. Night Shyamalan as Guard at Desk
 Charlie Hofheimer as Kevin Lupinski

Production
The film was originally titled The Woods, but the name was changed because a film in production by director Lucky McKee, The Woods (2006), already had that title. Like other Shyamalan productions, this film had high levels of secrecy surrounding it, to protect the expected twist ending that became a known Shyamalan trademark. Despite that, the script was stolen over a year before the film was released, prompting many "pre-reviews" of the film on several Internet film sites and much fan speculation about plot details. 
The village set in the film was built in its entirety in one field outside Chadds Ford, Pennsylvania. An adjacent field contained an on-location temporary sound stage. Production on the film started in October 2003, with delays because some scenes needing fall foliage could not be shot because of a late fall season. Principal photography was wrapped up in mid-December of that year. In April and May 2004, several of the lead actors were called back to the set. Reports noted that this seemed to have something to do with a change to the film's ending, and, in fact, the film's final ending differs from the ending in a stolen version of the script that surfaced a year earlier; the script version ends after Ivy climbs over the wall and gets help from a truck driver, while the film version has Ivy meeting a park ranger and scenes where she returns to the village.

Music

Soundtrack

The film's score was composed by James Newton Howard, and features solo violinist Hilary Hahn. The film was nominated for the Academy Award for Best Original Score, but lost to Finding Neverland.

Track listing
 "Noah Visits" 
 "What Are You Asking Me?" 
 "The Bad Color"
 "Those We Don't Speak Of"
 "Will You Help Me?"
 "I Cannot See His Color" 
 "Rituals"
 "The Gravel Road" 
 "Race to Resting Rock" 
 "The Forbidden Line" 
 "The Vote" 
 "It Is Not Real" 
 "The Shed Not to Be Used"

Release

Box office
The film grossed $114 million in the U.S., and $142 million in international markets. Its worldwide box office totalled $256 million, the tenth highest grossing PG-13 movie of 2004.

Reception

On Rotten Tomatoes, a review aggregator website, the film has an approval rating of 43% based on 218 reviews and an average rating of 5.4/10. The site's critics' consensus reads, "The Village is appropriately creepy, but Shyamalan's signature twist ending disappoints." At Metacritic, the film holds a score of 44 out of 100 based on 40 reviews, indicating "mixed or average reviews". Audiences surveyed by CinemaScore gave the film a grade "C" on scale of A+ to F.

Roger Ebert gave the film one star and wrote: "The Village is a colossal miscalculation, a movie based on a premise that cannot support it, a premise so transparent it would be laughable were the movie not so deadly solemn ... To call the ending an anticlimax would be an insult not only to climaxes but to prefixes. It's a crummy secret, about one step up the ladder of narrative originality from It was all a dream. It's so witless, in fact, that when we do discover the secret, we want to rewind the film so we don't know the secret anymore." Ebert named the film the tenth worst film of 2004 and subsequently put it on his "Most Hated" list. There were also comments that the film, while raising questions about conformity in a time of "evil," did little to "confront" those themes. Slate's Michael Agger commented that Shyamalan was continuing in a pattern of making "sealed-off movies that [fall] apart when exposed to outside logic."

The movie had a number of admirers. Critic Jeffrey Westhoff commented that though the film had its shortcomings, these did not necessarily render it a bad movie, and that "Shyamalan's orchestration of mood and terror is as adroit as ever." Philip Horne of The Daily Telegraph in a later review noted "this exquisitely crafted allegory of American soul-searching seems to have been widely misunderstood." 

The film has received some additional positive reviews since its release including Emily St. James of Vox and Chris Evangelista of SlashFilm who thought it was one of Shyamalan's best films, Adam Chitwood of Collider who praised the ending, the performances of Howard, Phoenix, and Hurt, and the cinematography, and Kayleigh Donaldson of Syfy Wire who praised the cinematography, and said, "...[the film] stands as one of the strongest representations of Shyamalan’s ethos, for better or worse." Carlos Morales of IGN argued that the film was misunderstood at the time of its release because it was mismarketed as a horror film, and also because of audience expectations that had been built up by Shyamalan's three previous films. "The real twist was that the movie they wanted wasn't the one Shyamalan made."

Accolades
2005 ASCAP Film and Television Music Awards
 Won – Top Box Office Film — James Newton Howard
2004 Academy Awards (Oscars)
 Nominated – Best Original Score — James Newton Howard
2005 10th Empire Awards
 Nominated – Best Actress — Bryce Dallas Howard
 Nominated – Best Newcomer — Bryce Dallas Howard
 Nominated – Best Director — M. Night Shyamalan
2005 Evening Standard British Film Awards
 Won – Best Technical/Artistic Achievement — Roger Deakins
2005 MTV Movie Awards
 Nominated – Best Breakthrough Female Performance — Bryce Dallas Howard
2005 Motion Picture Sound Editors (Golden Reel Award)
 Nominated – Best Sound Editing in a Feature: Music, Feature Film — Thomas S. Drescher
2004 Online Film Critics Society Awards
 Nominated – Best Breakthrough Performance — Bryce Dallas Howard
2005 Teen Choice Awards
 Nominated – Choice Movie Scary Scene — Bryce Dallas Howard, Ivy Walker waits at the door for Lucius Hunt.
 Nominated – Choice Movie: Thriller

Other honors
The film is recognized by American Film Institute in these lists:
 2005: AFI's 100 Years of Film Scores – Nominated

The soundtrack was widely praised, and was nominated by the American Film Institute as one of the Best Film Scores and the Academy Award for Best Original Score.

Plagiarism allegation
Simon & Schuster, publishers of the 1995 young adult book Running Out of Time by Margaret Peterson Haddix, claimed that the film had taken ideas from the book. The plot of Shyamalan's movie had several similarities to the book. They both involve a 19th-century village, which is actually a park in the present day, have young heroines on a search for medical supplies, and both have adult leaders bent on keeping the children in their village from discovering the truth.

No lawsuit was ever filed over the similarity.

See also
 Allegory of the cave

References

External links

 
 
 
 
 American Cinematographer Magazine, August 2004. Interview with Roger Deakins on The Village'''s cinematography.
 "Disney and Shyamalan in your back yard" – Website by a local resident describing the filming of The Village'' in Chadds Ford, Pennsylvania.
 The Woods unspecified draft script for The Village

2004 films
American thriller films
Films about blind people in the United States
Films involved in plagiarism controversies
Films set in forests
Films set in Pennsylvania
Films set in the 19th century
Films set in the 21st century
Films shot in Delaware
Films shot in New Jersey
Films shot in Pennsylvania
Touchstone Pictures films
Films with screenplays by M. Night Shyamalan
Films directed by M. Night Shyamalan
Films produced by M. Night Shyamalan
Films produced by Sam Mercer
Films produced by Scott Rudin
Films scored by James Newton Howard
2000s English-language films
2000s American films